Ahmet Nuri Diriker was a Turkish Brigadier General who fought in the Gallipoli Campaign,  Siege of Medina and Turkish War of Independence. 

He was born in Rusçuk in 1876. After finishing his studies in Kuleli Military High School, he enrolled in the Ottoman Military Academy. He graduated in 1896 as second lieutenant. He was sent to the Greek border to serve in the Greco-Turkish War of 1897. He later fought against the rebels in the Balkans. He was involved in the clashes with the Boatmen of Thessaloniki in 1903. He later went to Yemen as battalion commander to fight against Arab rebels. In 1915, he was appointed the commander of the 42nd Infantry Regiment in the Gallipoli Campaign. He fought against French troops in Seddülbahir and Kerevizdere regions.  In 1916, he and his regiment were sent to the Arabian Peninsula to break the Siege of Medina. After the Treaty of Sèvres, he joined Kuva-yi Milliye (Turkish resistance) and was involved in weapon and ammunition smuggling operations to Ankara. In 1921, he joined the Ankara Government under the command of Mustafa Kemal Atatürk and fought in the Greco-Turkish War (1919–1922). After the war, he presided over various military offices. He retired in 1931 as Brigadier General. He died in 1950.

Further reading 
 Mustafa Kemal Atatürk
 Kâzım Karabekir
 Battle of Krithia Vineyard

References 

1876 births
1950 deaths
Brigadier generals
Turkish Army generals
People from Ruse, Bulgaria